Aaadonta is a genus of air-breathing land snails, terrestrial pulmonate gastropod mollusks in the family Endodontidae. Specimens from this genus are endemic to Palau.

Species 
Species in the genus Aaadonta include:
 Aaadonta angaurana Solem, 1976
 Aaadonta constricta Semper, 1874; Type species
 Aaadonta fuscozonata (E.H. Beddome, 1889)
 Aaadonta irregularis Semper, 1874
 Aaadonta kinlochi Solem, 1976
 Aaadonta pelewana Solem, 1976

The genus was given its unusual name by the biologist Alan Solem, who wanted it to appear first in any alphabetical list of endodontid genera. For animal genera, the first alphabetically listed name is Aaaaba, which is a genus of beetles from Australia. The current conservation status, according to the IUCN Red List, varies depending on species, though they all fall into the larger category of being threatened. One cause of a low population stated by Solem could be that ant colonies that come into the area can prey on eggs of the various species, thus wiping out a large number of snails, potentially without harming the adult snails. Some species, like the fuscozonata, have not been found recently and leads researchers to believe that they may already be extinct.

Establishing the Genus 
While single localities had been found before Alan Solem established the genus, such as Aaadonta angaurana in 1936, the six species were first defined in Solem's 1976 paper. Solem defined the genus' and species qualities in 8 rules defining shell shape.

But since the genus was established, many of the species within it have been difficult to keep track of. A report in 2005 only found Aaandonta constricta and Aaandonta kinlochi.

Environment 
The habitat where Aaadonta were typically found ranged from primary forests to secondary forests, and even to mountain bases. However, they usually resided on the underside of natural resources. Moreover, they were found under rocks or stones, and under leaves. Some species were found living on dead plants and low levels of trees, as well as on the moss of some boulders.

See also 
 Zyzzyxdonta

References

Further reading
Endodontoid land snails from Pacific Islands (Mollusca : Pulmonata : Sigmurethra). Alan Solem ... ; [collab.] Barbara K. Solem. Chicago, Ill. :Field Museum of Natural History, 1976.
Endodontoid land snails from Pacific Islands (Mollusca : Pulmonata : Sigmurethra). Alan Solem. Chicago :Field museum of Natural History, 1982. 
Field Museum of Natural History bulletin. Chicago, Field Museum of Natural History,[1930]-c1990.
Proceedings of the California Academy of Sciences. San Francisco, The Academy. 
Endodontoid land snails from Pacific islands (Mollusca: Pulmonata:  Sigmurethra) Part 1. Family Endodontidae. Field Museum of Natural  History, Chicago, 1976: i–xii, 1–508.  [Zoological Record Volume 115]

Endodontidae
Fauna of Palau